Marja Lehtonen is a professional female bodybuilder and personal trainer from Finland, born in 1968 in Tampere.

Background
Lehtonen was born in Tampere, Finland in 1968. Always interested in outdoor activities, she joined a sports club in 1983 and became a track athlete. Through training as a sprinter she discovered an interest in weightlifting. After two years of growing interest in bodybuilding, she decided to see if she could compete in the field and entered the Finland National Championship. She won 2nd place in the lightweight category, taking her to the World Championship in Mexico City in 1990, where she finished 7th.

Lehtonen stands 5'2" and competes at a weight of 120 pounds (her off-season weight is 138 pounds).  As a teenager she competed as a sprinter before turning to bodybuilding.  She gives her best lifts as a curl (EZ-curl-bar) of 150 pounds for eight reps, and a bench press of 242 pounds for two reps .

Contest history 
 1990 Pohjanmaa Grand Prix - 1st lightweight (under 52 kg)
 1990 National Championship (Finland) - 2nd (LW)
 1990 World Championship - 7th (LW)
 1991 National Championship - 1st (MW - under 57 kg)
 1991 European Championship - 7th (LW)
 1991 World Championship - 14th (MW)
 1994 World Championship - 4th (MW)
 1999 World Championship - 4th (MW)
 2000 European Championship - 2nd (MW)
 2001 Jan Tana Classic - 3rd (LW)
 2001 Women’s Extravaganza - 2nd (MW)
 2002 Jan Tana Classic - 3rd (LW)
 2003 Night of Champions - 3rd (LW)
 2004 Night of Champions - 2nd (LW)
 2004 IFBB Ms. Olympia - 3rd (LW)
 2005 IFBB Ms. Olympia - 14th
 2007 Jan Tana Classic - 3rd (LW)
 2008 Atlantic City Pro - 4th
 2010 New York Pro - 8th

External links 
 

Finnish female bodybuilders
1968 births
Living people
Sportspeople from Tampere
Professional bodybuilders